The Work is the official student publication of Tarlac State University (TSU) in Tarlac City, Philippines founded in 1948. It is a member of the College Editors Guild of the Philippines (CEGP), the oldest existing alliance of student publications in the country committed to uphold students' rights and press freedom.

The Work circulates its regular issue at least four times in an academic year and its literary folio, Obra, once in a year. It also releases special issues for the university intramurals and student elections and a mid-year issue after the regular semesters.

It is under the Office of Student Affairs and is financially dependent of the university. It is run by an editorial board comprising an editor-in-chief, associate editor, managing editor, associate managing editor, and section editors, all of whom are undergraduate students, supervised by an adviser.

Apart from its published issues, The Work also holds LAAB, a seminar and workshop for student journalists on campus, and Lathala, an annual literary and arts competition where winning works are published in Obra.

The Work is a two-time Best Performing Publication in the Regional Higher Education Press Conference (RHEPC) and it is the recipient of the Best Publication award at the 6th Gawad Jemalyn Lacadin, a regional biennial event organized by CEGP.

Sections
The regular issues of The Work are published in different formats (broadsheet, magazine, tabloid, newsletter) and contain six sections—the news, editorial and opinion, development communication, features, literary and culture, and the sports sections.
 
News - It usually includes university-based news, local and national news, and other stories affecting the TSU community. It occupies the largest portion of every issue.
Editorial and Opinion
Features 
Development Communication
Literary and Culture
Sports

Activities
LAAB and Lathala are university-wide activities the publication organizes. LAAB is a journalism and arts seminar-workshop offered to college publications annually. Commenced in 2008, it aims to develop effective student journalists and to make college publications more active in campus journalism. Moreover, Lathala was launched in 2010 to discover students' talent in the field of literature and arts. It is a competition open to all students of TSU, and the winners and other selected works are published in Obra, The Work's literary folio.

References

Publications established in 1948